Jangan-dong is a dong (neighborhood) of Dongdaemun-gu in Seoul, South Korea.

Jangan-dong is situated in Dongdaemun-gu in East-Central Seoul.  It is a rapidly modernizing neighborhood with an old city feel. By day, it is a bustling residential area of Seoul with several apartment complexes visible, including those built by Hillstate, SM, Samsung Ramien, and Hyundai. By night, Jangan-dong's main street lights up with a plethora of Korean-style and American style bars, motels, nightclubs, restaurants. Jangan-dong is an affordable area to live, and can be considered attractive for its centralized location and quick transportation into the heart of Gangnam or Dongdaemun.

There are countless restaurants in the Jangan-dong area. Most restaurants serve traditional Korean food, but there are also many international food restaurants including Vietnamese, Chinese, and Japanese. American food chains like McDonald's, Pizza Hut, Starbucks, and Outback Steakhouse are also in the neighborhood. Jangan-dong has over twenty modern coffee shops, with more opening their doors daily. As for shopping, the Bauhaus department store sells a variety of goods from Top 10, ABC Mart and Nike. The mall also include a large food court, Lotte grocery store, and a movie theatre. There are also several English Academies, including Dongdaemun Poly School.

Near Jangang-dong subway station on the purple line #5, several used automotive and repair shops can be found.  Near some of the southernmost subway exits, men stand in the street and shout in attempts to woo customers into their auto shop. Northeast of the subway and one street behind are several low-priced shops doing auto repair on air conditioners, fixing damaged bumpers, selling new wheels and rims, etc.

See also 
Administrative divisions of South Korea

References

External links
Dongdaemun-gu map

1http://koreabeat.com/?p=2028

2https://web.archive.org/web/20081122073932/http://www.rjkoehler.com/2008/09/08/jangan-dong-wars-episode-ii-the-pimps-strike-back/

Neighbourhoods of Dongdaemun District